Women's City Club may refer to:

Detroit Women's City Club
Saint Paul Women's City Club
Women's City Club of New York
Women's City Club of Boston
Women's City Club of Chicago
Women's City Club of Washington, D.C.